The 1908 International Cross Country Championships was held in Colombes, France, at the Stade de Matin on 26 March 1908.  A report on the event was given in the Glasgow Herald.

Complete results, medallists, 
 and the results of British athletes were published.

Medallists

Individual Race Results

Men's (10 mi / 16.1 km)

Team Results

Men's

Participation
An unofficial count yields the participation of 54 athletes from 5 countries.

 (12)
 (12)
 (11)
 (11)
 (8)

See also
 1908 in athletics (track and field)

References

International Cross Country Championships
International Cross Country Championships
Cross
International Cross Country Championships
International Cross Country Championships
Cross country running in France